The Iemma ministry (2007–08) or Second Iemma ministry is the 90th ministry of the Government of New South Wales, and was led by the 40th Premier Morris Iemma. It was the second and subsequent of two occasions when Iemma was Premier.

The Second Iemma Labor ministry was formed following the 2007 state election where the Iemma government was re-elected.

This ministry covers the period from 2 April 2007 until 5 September 2008, when the Rees ministry was sworn in after Nathan Rees succeeded Iemma as Premier in a Labor caucus revolt on 5 September 2008.

Composition of ministry
The ministry was announced on 2 April 2007. Paul Gibson was set to be appointed to the portfolios of Sport, Western Sydney and assistant minister for road safety however he was dumped amid allegations of domestic violence. The Labor caucus elected Barbara Perry unopposed for promotion to the ministry. Phil Koperberg resigned from the ministry in February 2008 prompting a second minor rearrangement.

 
Ministers are members of the Legislative Assembly unless otherwise noted.

See also

Members of the New South Wales Legislative Assembly, 2007-2011
Members of the New South Wales Legislative Council, 2007-2011

Notes

References

 

! colspan=3 style="border-top: 5px solid #cccccc" | New South Wales government ministries

New South Wales ministries
2007 establishments in Australia
2008 disestablishments in Australia
Australian Labor Party ministries in New South Wales